The Ely Professorship of Divinity was one of the professorships in divinity at the University of Cambridge. Originally part of the Regius Professorship of Greek, it was detached in 1889 and funded by the canonry of Ely, but has since been suppressed. The professors holding this chair were thus made residentiary canons of Ely Cathedral.

Ely Professors

 Vincent Henry Stanton (1889)
 Alan England Brooke (1916)
 John Martin Creed (1926)
 John Sandwith Boys Smith (1940)
 William Telfer (1944)
 Edward Craddock Ratcliffe (1947)
 Stanley Lawrence Greenslade (1958)
 G.W.H. Lampe (1960)
 George Christopher Stead (1971)

References

 
Divinity, Ely
School of Arts and Humanities, University of Cambridge
1889 establishments in the United Kingdom
Divinity, Ely, Cambridge
Diocese of Ely